Koroivos (before 1955: Κελεβή - Kelevi) is a village in the municipal unit of Gastouni, Elis, Greece. It is situated in a flat rural area, south of the river Pineios. It is 2 km southeast of Lefkochori, 2 km west of Roupaki, 2 km southwest of Agia Mavra and 4 km east of Gastouni. The village was named after Coroebus of Elis, one of the winners of the first Ancient Olympic Games.

References

External links
GTP - Koroivos

See also

List of settlements in Elis
Coroebus of Elis

Populated places in Elis